Dark and Light may refer to:

 Dark and Light (2006 video game), a pay-to-play MMORPG developed by NPCube
 Dark and Light (2017 video game), a "fantasy survival sandbox RPG" developed by Snail Games based on the 2006 game

See also
 Black-and-white dualism, a metaphorical expression of good and evil
 Darkness and Light (disambiguation)
 Light and Darkness (disambiguation)